Suzanne Mathis McQueen is an American author, feminist, inspirational leader, She is best known for her work with the symbolism and primal wisdom of the lunar rhythmic female hormones.

Early life
McQueen was born Suzanne Yvonne Mathis in Honolulu, Territory of Hawaii on July 27, 1957, to Helen Hooks of North Carolina, and Frederick Mathis of Tennessee, both of English, Scottish, and Welsh descent. Helen was a homemaker and Frederick was a Marine stationed at Kaneohe Marine Base on Oahu at the time. Siblings Rosemary Mathis LaBonte is three years older, and brother, Kim Mathis is two years older.

In 1958, Frederick’s tour of duty in Hawaii ended and the family moved back to their home in Santa Ana, California, where the kids would grow up.  After high school, and studying at Cal State Fullerton and San Diego State, Suzanne decided to travel to Europe and Hawaii. After that, instead of finishing her university curriculum she moved to Big Sur, California at the age of 23 to live among the artists and to attend the Monterey Academy of Hair Design. While working at a resort in Big Sur, she met and married David Backer and had two children, Ian and Preston. After 8 years, the Backers moved to Ashland, Oregon. Eventually divorcing, Suzanne later married Wade McQueen, also of Big Sur. Together they had one daughter, Myan Rose.

Career
An entrepreneur since age 25, McQueen is a former cosmetologist and owner of two salons before building the first and largest day spa in Ashland, Oregon, in 1996 while also co-founding a private aesthetics and skin-care school. Specializing in the client experience and customer service, she received the Ashland Chamber of Commerce Service Business of the Year award in 2000. She is a past president of Women Entrepreneurs of Oregon, and a former mentor for Southern Oregon Women’s Access to Credit.

Much of her work is about using ancient ways and wisdom to solve today’s challenges, as well as the use of “natural rhythm principals”, a word she coined in her book, 4 Seasons in 4 Weeks. Natural rhythm principals suggest scientific, mirroring patterns of the body and mind rhythms of humans and other living things with infinite universal forces in nature. Specifically her work points out the sacred geometry of the female hormonal cycle with not only the moon, but other planetary and universal forces, all which have some version of a resting, building, expressing, and deconstructing phase as they cycle in and out. Her 4 Seasons in 4 Weeks (4s4w) work introduces the idea of a female 28-day body clock, which she coined a “circamena rhythm” (about a moon month), likened to the 24-hour body clock circadian rhythm (about a day), coined by Franz Halberg in the late 1950s. McQueen offers the idea that women do not have “mood swings” but are instead, “lunar rhythmic”, and also have rhythmic sex drives. Eating, exercising, communicating, and living monthly rhythmically-conscious, she states, is the healthiest way for women to be in personal alignment for wellbeing. She believes this is the missing piece to women’s empowerment and sovereignty of their bodies. “Combination health” is the idea that each individual is unique and must use a variety of healing modalities to unlock the mysteries of their ailments and align with their personal body, mind, and spirit wellbeing.

Books
4 Seasons in 4 Weeks: Awakening the Power, Wisdom, and Beauty in Every.
Woman's Nature, The 4s4w Daily Tracker and Journal, a Companion Guide.
In addition she has written a pilot eBook to an upcoming series called, The Business Shaman: The Mind, Body, and Spirit of Workplace Wealth.

References

American spiritual teachers
American women writers
1957 births
Living people
Beauticians
People from Santa Ana, California
Writers from California
American feminist writers
21st-century American women